Montpeyroux may refer to the following places in France:

 Montpeyroux, Aveyron, a commune of the Aveyron département
 Montpeyroux, Dordogne, a commune of the Dordogne département
 Montpeyroux, Hérault, a commune of the Hérault département
 Montpeyroux, Puy-de-Dôme, a commune of the Puy-de-Dôme département